Alfred Dobbs (1878−1954) was a pioneer Australian rugby league footballer from the 1900s.

Alf ‘Bullock’ Dobbs was a rugby union convert who played with Balmain and Glebe in the amateur game before talking part in the NSW rebel series against the NZ ‘All Golds’ in 1907. Dobbs played for Balmain in the inaugural season of rugby league and although he did not take part in any of the infant code's representative matches that year he was a late inclusion (along with Jim Abercrombie) on the pioneer 1908-09 Kangaroo Tour. The hardy forward appeared in just five matches on the ground-breaking tour and retired from the game in 1909.

Alf Dobbs died on 23 June 1954.

References

1878 births
1954 deaths
Australian rugby league players
Balmain Tigers players
Australia national rugby league team players
Rugby league second-rows
Rugby league players from Sydney